Ahmadabad-e Shadjerd (also Romanized as Aḩmadābād-e Shādjerd; also known as Aḩmadābād-e Shāhjerd) is a village in Taraznahid Rural District, in the Central District of Saveh County, Markazi Province, Iran. At the 2006 census, its population was 24, in 7 families.

References 

Populated places in Saveh County